The Netherlands national under-19 football team represents the Netherlands at this age level and is governed by the Koninklijke Nederlandse Voetbalbond — KNVB.
They compete in international competitions like the UEFA European Under-19 Championship and the FIFA U-20 World Cup.

Competitive record

FIFA U-20 World Cup

UEFA European Under-18 Championship

UEFA European Under-19 Football Championship

Results and fixtures

Current squad 
The following players were selected for the 2022 UEFA European Under-19 Championship qualification matches against Serbia, Norway and Ukraine on 1, 4 and 7 June 2022 respectively.

Caps and goals correct as of 28 May 2022.

References

External links 
 Netherlands U-19 UEFA.com
 Netherlands U-19 OnsOranje
 Netherlands U-19 results & selection OnsOranje

European national under-19 association football teams
Football
Youth football in the Netherlands